Italy will be represented at the 2012 European Athletics Championships held in Helsinki by the athletes that have achieved the standard of participation fixed by FIDAL.

Medalists

Team
Are qualified the athletes who have achieved the standard set by the Italian Federation of Athletics (maximum three athletes for event). The events of race walking and marathon will be not disputed at Helsinki, because the races is too close to the 2012 Summer Olympics of London.

On June 18, after a few defections to injury, the federal technicians (particularly the manager  of the national team) informed the final list of 61 participants (33 men and 28 women).

Results

Finalists (top 8)

See also
 Athletics in Italy
 Italy national athletics team
 Italy at the 2012 Summer Olympics - Athletics

References

External links
 21st European Athletics Championships - Helsinki 2012

2012 in Italian sport
2012
Nations at the 2012 European Athletics Championships